Yuchoku Higa (1910–1994) was a Japanese Shorin-ryu karate master who was awarded Hanshi (10th dan) in 1976. He was a politician served as a Naha City Council member and a chair of the Naha City Council.

Biography
In 1927, he began training under Jiro Shiroma who was a student of Higa's father 
In 1934, under Jinan Shinzato he began training te and Goju-ryu.
In 1948 he began studies under Chōshin Chibana and in 1965 was awarded 9th dan by Chibana.

He served as president of the Okinawa Prefecture Karatedo Federation and the All Okinawa Karatedo Federation.
In 1976 he received the rank of Hanshi, 10th Dan.

References

External links
Yuchoku Higa Practice Karate In The Moonlight
Higa Yuchoku's picture

1910 births
1994 deaths
Japanese male karateka
Shōrin-ryū practitioners